Events in the year 2021 in the Marshall Islands.

Incumbents 

 President: David Kabua
 Speaker of the house: Kenneth Kedi

Events 
Ongoing – COVID-19 pandemic in Oceania

 28 May – The Marshall Islands recognizes Fiamē Naomi Mataʻafa and the FAST party following the 2021 Samoan constitutional crisis.

Deaths

See also 

 COVID-19 pandemic in the Marshall Islands
 2020 in Oceania
 2019–20 South Pacific cyclone season
 2020–21 South Pacific cyclone season

References 

 
2020s in the Marshall Islands
Years of the 21st century in the Marshall Islands
Marshall Islands
Marshall Islands